XHPCTN-FM is a radio station on 88.3 FM in Compostela, Nayarit, Mexico. It is owned by Multimedios Radio and carries its La Lupe variety hits format.

History
XHPCTN was awarded in the IFT-4 radio auction of 2017 and came to air on June 7, 2018 with Multimedios's Hits pop format. It is the first radio station licensed to Compostela, though the primary market served is the state capital of Tepic.

In late August 2018, XHPCTN flipped to the La Lupe variety hits format.

References

2018 establishments in Mexico
Radio stations established in 2018
Radio stations in Nayarit
Spanish-language radio stations
Multimedios Radio